The International Relations and Trade Select Committee (Malay: Jawatankuasa Pilihan Khas Hubungan dan Perdagangan Antarabangsa; ; Tamil: மலேசியா சர்வதேச உறவுகள் மற்றும் வர்த்தக ஆணையம்) is one of many select committees of the Malaysian House of Representatives, which scrutinises the Ministry of Domestic Trade and Consumer Affairs, Ministry of International Trade and Industry and Ministry of Foreign Affairs. It is among four new bipartisan parliamentary select committees announced by the Minister in the Prime Minister's Department in charge of legal affairs, Liew Vui Keong, on 17 October 2019 in an effort to improve the institutional system.

Membership

14th Parliament 
As of December 2019, the Committee's current members are as follows:

Chair of the International Relations and Trade Select Committee

See also
Parliamentary Committees of Malaysia

References

Parliament of Malaysia
Committees of the Parliament of Malaysia
Committees of the Dewan Rakyat
Parliamentary committees on Foreign Affairs
Parliamentary committees on International Trade